Alessandro "Alle" Benassi is an Italian DJ, songwriter and record producer, best known as a member of Benassi Bros. and as a co-writer of several hits for Chris Brown.

Career

Benassi and his cousin Benny Benassi began DJing in their home town of Reggio Emilia in the 1980s. In the mid-1990s, they started working for Larry Pignagnoli's Off Limits production company. There, they produced music for several acts, including Whigfield. Alessandro Benassi did writing and arrangements for the 2002 album Whigfield 4.

Alessandro and Benny Benassi then released a number of albums under the name Benassi Bros.: Hypnotica (2003), Pumphonia (2004), and ...Phobia (2005).

He later went on to produce the album “Rock the Dog” (2008)[under the name Mobbing] and to co-write a number of songs for Chris Brown, including "Beautiful People" (2011) and "Don't Wake Me Up" (2012).

Songwriting credits

References

Living people
People from Reggio Emilia
Italian DJs
Italian songwriters
Male songwriters
Electronic dance music DJs
Year of birth missing (living people)